Genrikh Bulgakov (19 January 1929 – 2010) was a Soviet fencer. He competed in the team épée event at the 1952 Summer Olympics.

References

1929 births
2010 deaths
Soviet male fencers
Olympic fencers of the Soviet Union
Fencers at the 1952 Summer Olympics